Mustafa Dalcı (born 1 July 1973) is a Turkish former association football player and current coach.

Managerial career
After an unassuming career as an amateur footballer, Dalcı managed various amateur sides in Turkey. He managed Ankaraspor in the TFF First League in 2019, and had a stint as interim manager for Ankaragücü. Dalcı signed a contract with Ankaragücü in the Süper Lig for 1.5 years on 23 January 2021.

References

External links
 
 TFF Manager Profile

1973 births
People from Sivas
Turkish footballers
Association football defenders
Kasımpaşa S.K. footballers
İstanbulspor managers
Ankaraspor managers
MKE Ankaragücü managers
Gençlerbirliği S.K. managers
Living people
Süper Lig managers